Loppa Church is a parish church of the Church of Norway in Loppa Municipality in Troms og Finnmark county, Norway. It is located in the village of Loppa on the sparsely populated island of Loppa. It is one of the churches in the Loppa parish which is part of the Alta prosti (deanery) in the Diocese of Nord-Hålogaland. The white, wooden church was built in a long church style in 1953 using plans drawn up by the architects Hans Magnus and Johan Lindstrøm. The church seats about 150 people, but it is rarely used since the island has few residents.

History
The earliest existing historical records of the church date back to the year 1589, but the church was not new that year, it was likely built in the 13th century. This island was historically the centre of the parish, and thus this was the main church for the area. According to an old legend, the Russians burned the church during the middle ages. The new church had a nave and choir but it did not have a sacristy or tower. Around the year 1700, the church was described as "quite dilapidated" and in great need of repair. It wasn't until around 1747 that the church was torn down and replaced with a new cruciform building.

In 1814, this church served as an election church. Together with more than 300 other parish churches across Norway, it was a polling station for elections to the 1814 Norwegian Constituent Assembly which wrote the Constitution of Norway. This was Norway's first national elections. Each church parish was a constituency that elected people called "electors" who later met together in each county to elect the representatives for the assembly that was to meet in Eidsvoll later that year.

The church was burned down by the Germans during their withdrawal towards the end of World War II in 1944. The German commander was a theologian and he reportedly ordered the his subordinates to not burn the church, but they did so anyway. The graveyard remains at the site of the old church. The new church was consecrated on 5 September 1954 by the Bishop Alf Wiig. Since the mid- to late-20th century, most residents of the island have moved away from the small, isolated island and now this church is not regularly used.

Media gallery

See also
List of churches in Nord-Hålogaland

References

Loppa
Churches in Finnmark
Wooden churches in Norway
20th-century Church of Norway church buildings
Churches completed in 1953
13th-century establishments in Norway
Norwegian election church
Long churches in Norway